Sundarakanda is a 2008 Indian Telugu-language drama film directed by Bapu, starring Allari Naresh and Charmme Kaur. The story is provided by Mullapudi Ramana and music by Vidyasagar. This film is the remake of Hollywood film What a Girl wants (2003).

Plot
Pinky (Charmi) is the daughter of Sita (Prema), who keeps away from her husband. On Pinky's insistence, Sita reveals the past. She met Raja Ravivarma (Sunil Sharma), the son of Zamindar Surendra Varma (Ranganath) on a study tour of a tribal village. They fell in love and got married then and there.  His son's marriage with Sita, a commoner, gave such a shock to Surendra Varma that he lost the use of his legs. Ravivarma's mother Bharati (Sangeetha) pleaded with Sita to leave the palace to save the family honor. After Sita left, Bhushanam (Vizag Prasad), Surendra Varma's brother-in-law, raises a hue and cry that Sita stole gold ornaments from the palace and escaped. Being so discredited even in the eyes of her love and husband, she stayed away.

Now, the story revolves around Pinky's efforts to reunite her parents. She is a lively girl trying to make friends with her father's family. She pretends to be sent by the party bosses to pick the candidate for minister's post. She dabbles in this political charade with the help of Naresh (Allari Naresh), a journalist. Her father's opponent Kota (Kota Srinivasa Rao), who is also an aspiring candidate for the Chief Minister post, and his mates provide the comedy and political satire. She succeeds in reuniting the family and exposing the villains. Music with lyrics reminding one of the tribal idiom is a treat. The visuals with the rustic outdoor and the heavily ornate interiors of a feudal gentry have the stamp of Bapu.

Cast 

 Allari Naresh as Naresh, journalist
 Charmi as Pinky
 Prema as Sita
 Sunil Sharma as Raja Ravi Varma
 Kota Srinivasa Rao as Kota
 Sangeetha as Bharathi
 Vizag Prasad as Bhushanam
 Ranganath as Zamindar Surendra Varma
 Kondavalasa Lakshmana Rao
 Chittajalu Lakshmipati
 L. B. Sriram
 Rallapalli

Soundtrack 

The music was composed by Vidyasagar.

References

2000s Telugu-language films
2008 films
Films directed by Bapu
Films with screenplays by Mullapudi Venkata Ramana
Films scored by Vidyasagar